Statistics of Football League First Division in the 1971–72 season.

Overview
Derby County won the First Division title for the first time in the club's history that season. Derby's first ever First Division title was confirmed on May 8, after title challengers Liverpool and Leeds United failed to win their final games at Arsenal and Wolverhampton Wanderers respectively. On April 26, Huddersfield Town and Nottingham Forest were relegated after Crystal Palace beat Stoke City 2-0 at Selhurst Park to ensure their survival.

League standings

Results

Managerial changes

Team locations

Top scorers

References

RSSSF

Football League First Division seasons
Eng
1971–72 Football League
1971–72 in English football leagues

lt:Anglijos futbolo varžybos 1971–1972 m.
hu:1971–1972-es angol labdarúgó-bajnokság (első osztály)
ru:Футбольная лига Англии 1971-1972